Vazhikkadavu is a village in Nilambur taluk of Malappuram district, Kerala, India.

Geography 
It is located on the CNG (Calicut-Nilambur-Gudalur) road 20 km north-east of Nilambur. Just after Vazhikkadavu town the ghat road known as Nadukani Churam starts through forests leading to Nadukani (20 km away) in Nilgiris district. The Kerala-Tamil Nadu border is at about 10 km from Vazhikkadavu.

Transport

Road 
Vazhikkadavu is connected to major cities/towns in Kerala by road. Local buses reach Manjeri, Perinthalmanna, Kozhikode, Palakkad, Thrissur, Ernakulam, Kottayam, Thiruvananthapuram, etc. Inter-state buses reach Gudalur, Ooty, Mysore, Mandya, Hasan, Bangalore and Sulthan Bathery.

Tarred roads connect Vazhikkadavu to Karakkode,Puthirippadam, Vellakkatta, Poovathippoyil, Marutha (through Mamankara) and Nellikkuth (from Manimooli).

Rail 
The nearest railway station is Nilambur Road railway station

Air. 
The nearest airport is Calicut International Airport, which is 60 kilometres away.

Services 
Check posts of sales tax, forest, excise and motor vehicle departments are also present.

The Nadukani Ghat is famous for its greenery. It has rare species.

Places of worship 
Masjids serve various parts of Vazhikkadavu including the ancient Marutha Juma Masjid.

The Karakkode Durga Devi Temple and Sri Ramananda Ashram are Hindu pilgrim sites in Nilambur area. The temple is under the management of Ramananda Ashram. H.H. Swami Sreedharananda is the founder of the ashram.

There are many churches including Christ the King Forane Church at Manimooly, St. Gregorios Orthodox Church at Mamamkara, St.Joseph Catholic Church at Narivalamunda, St.George Orthodox church at Modapoika,Assemblies of God church at Mamamkara,India Pentecostal Church of God church at Manimooly, St.Mary's Malankara Catholic church at Mamankara and Many other Evangelical Churches

Naxalite threat
In November, 2016, three Naxalites were killed near Karulai in an encounter with Kerala police. Naxalite leader Kappu Devaraj from Andhra Pradesh was one of those killed. Naxalites visit the locality regularly to ask for food and shelter from the tribals. The police comb the area regularly, without making arrests. On 27 September 2016, Maoists and Kerala police fought in this area although no one was injured.

Suburbs 
 Mundappotty
 Modapoika
 Narivalamunda
 Mamamkara
 Palad village
 Nellikuth Junction
 Panchayathangady
 Kettungal
 Poovathipoyyil
 Karakkode
 Manimooly
 Kambalakkallu
 Korankunnu
 Anamari
 Varakkulam

Transport
Vazhikkadavu village connects to other parts of India through Nilambur town. State Highway No.28 starts from Nilambur and connects to Ooty, Mysore and Bangalore through Highways.12,29 and 181. National highway No.66 passes through Ramanattukara and the northern stretch connects to Goa and Mumbai. The southern stretch connects to Cochin and Trivandrum.  State.

The nearest airport is at Karippor.

The nearest major railway station is at Nilambur.

See also
 Nilambur town
 Edakkara town
 Gudalur
 Mango Orange village
 Pandalur town
 Devala, Nilgris
 Nilambur-Shoranur railway line

References

Villages in Malappuram district
Nilambur area